Charles "Chuck" Kopp is a retired police officer and former member of the Alaska House of Representatives from the 24th district. Elected in 2016, he assumed office in 2017.

Early life and education 
Kopp was born in Anchorage, Alaska and raised in Iliamna, Alaska. His parents were educators and entrepreneurs. He attended high school at the Cook Inlet Academy in Kalifornsky, Alaska. Kopp earned a Bachelor of Arts degree from the University of Alaska Anchorage.

Career 
Kopp served as an officer in the Anchorage Police Department and Kenai Police Department for a combined 20 years. He later became a certified polygraph examiner. For seven years, he served as Chief of Police of Kenai, Alaska and acting city manager from 2005 to 2006.

Kopp served as an advisor to Governors Sarah Palin and Frank Murkowski. He also served as the chief of staff for two members of the Alaska Senate. He was elected to the Alaska House of Representatives in 2016 and assumed office in 2017. A member of the Alaska Republican Party, Kopp was affiliated with the Republican Coalition in the Alaska House, a bipartisan group of Democratic, Republican, and Independent politicians. Kopp has written opinion columns for the Anchorage Daily News, Juneau Empire, and Peninsula Clarion.

References

Living people
People from Anchorage, Alaska
Republican Party members of the Alaska House of Representatives
University of Alaska Anchorage alumni
American municipal police chiefs
People from Kenai, Alaska
Year of birth missing (living people)
21st-century American politicians